The 1960 Tennessee Volunteers (variously "Tennessee", "UT" or the "Vols") represented the University of Tennessee in the 1960 NCAA University Division football season. Playing as a member of the Southeastern Conference (SEC), the team was led by head coach Bowden Wyatt, in his sixth year, and played their home games at Shields–Watkins Field in Knoxville, Tennessee. They finished the season with a record of six wins, two losses and two ties (6–2–2 overall, 3–2–2 in the SEC).

Schedule

Roster
TB Billy Majors, Sr.

Team players drafted into the NFL

References

Tennessee
Tennessee Volunteers football seasons
Tennessee Volunteers football